This page lists nationwide public opinion polling among demographics that have been conducted relating to the 2016 United States presidential election between prospective Democratic and Republican candidates. The two major party candidates were chosen at the Democratic National Convention and Republican National Convention in July 2016. The general election occurred on Tuesday, November 8, 2016.

Two-way race

By race or ethnicity

African Americans

Asian Americans

Hispanic Americans

White Americans

Non-white/Minority Americans

By education

White Americans with a college degree

White Americans without a college degree

By gender

Male Americans

Female Americans

Other criteria

Independent voters

LGBT Americans

Young Americans

Americans with household incomes of $100,000 or more

Three-way race

Independent voters

Four-way race

By race or ethnicity

African Americans

Hispanic Americans

White Americans

By gender

Female Americans

Male Americans

By education

White Americans with a college degree

White Americans without a college degree

By age

Americans aged 18–34

Americans aged 35–49

Americans aged 50–64

Americans aged 65+

Other criteria

Independent voters

Americans with household incomes of $100,000 or more

Military

LGBT Americans

See also
General election polling
Nationwide opinion polling for the United States presidential election, 2016
Statewide opinion polling for the United States presidential election, 2016
International opinion polling for the United States presidential election, 2016

Democratic primary polling
Nationwide opinion polling for the Democratic Party 2016 presidential primaries
Statewide opinion polling for the Democratic Party presidential primaries, 2016

Republican primary polling
Nationwide opinion polling for the Republican Party 2016 presidential primaries
Statewide opinion polling for the Republican Party presidential primaries, 2016

References

External links
Exit polls for the 2016 election.
Bloomberg Politics Poll Decoder.
Pew Research .
Gallup.

Opinion polling for the 2016 United States presidential election